In agriculture, a catch crop is a fast-growing crop that is grown between successive plantings of a main crop.

For example, radishes that mature from seed in 25–30 days can be grown between rows of most vegetables, and harvested long before the main crop matures. Or, a catch crop can be planted between the spring harvest and fall planting of some crops.

Catch cropping is a type of succession planting. It makes more efficient use of growing space.

Catch crops are also crops that are sown to prevent minerals being flushed away from the soil: crops such as grain are used to keep certain minerals not attached to the soil-clay connection in the soil.

References

Crops